In seven-dimensional geometry, a cantic 7-cube or truncated 7-demicube as a uniform 7-polytope, being a truncation of the 7-demicube.

A uniform 7-polytope is vertex-transitive and constructed from uniform 6-polytope facets, and can be represented a coxeter diagram with ringed nodes representing active mirrors. A demihypercube is an alternation of a hypercube. 

Alternate names 
 Truncated demihepteract
 Truncated hemihepteract (thesa) (Jonathan Bowers)

Cartesian coordinates 
The Cartesian coordinates for the 1344 vertices of a truncated 7-demicube centered at the origin and edge length 6 are coordinate permutations:
 (±1,±1,±3,±3,±3,±3,±3)
with an odd number of plus signs.

Images

It can be visualized as a 2-dimensional orthogonal projections, for example the a D7 Coxeter plane, containing 12-gonal symmetry. Most visualizations in symmetric projections will contain overlapping vertices, so the colors of the vertices are changed based on how many vertices are at each projective position, here shown with red color for no overlaps.

Related polytopes 

There are 95 uniform polytopes with D6 symmetry, 63 are shared by the B6 symmetry, and 32 are unique:

Notes

References
 H.S.M. Coxeter: 
 H.S.M. Coxeter, Regular Polytopes, 3rd Edition, Dover New York, 1973 
 Kaleidoscopes: Selected Writings of H.S.M. Coxeter, edited by F. Arthur Sherk, Peter McMullen, Anthony C. Thompson, Asia Ivic Weiss, Wiley-Interscience Publication, 1995,  
 (Paper 22) H.S.M. Coxeter, Regular and Semi Regular Polytopes I, [Math. Zeit. 46 (1940) 380–407, MR 2,10]
 (Paper 23) H.S.M. Coxeter, Regular and Semi-Regular Polytopes II, [Math. Zeit. 188 (1985) 559–591]
 (Paper 24) H.S.M. Coxeter, Regular and Semi-Regular Polytopes III, [Math. Zeit. 200 (1988) 3–45]
 Norman Johnson Uniform Polytopes, Manuscript (1991)
 N.W. Johnson: The Theory of Uniform Polytopes and Honeycombs, Ph.D.

External links 
 
 Polytopes of Various Dimensions
 Multi-dimensional Glossary

7-polytopes